The Transmission site Landespolizeidirektion Karlsruhe is a site with short wave aerial and an 81 metre tall telecommunication tower at  on the Lerchenberg near Wildberg, 20 kilometre westwards of Stuttgart. The whole area is undertunneled and equipped with an entrance which can be passed by vehicles with a height of 3.8 metres.
The facility is used as centre for catastrophe management.

See also 
 List of towers

External links
 External link
 http://www.skyscraperpage.com/diagrams/?b46127

Buildings and structures in Calw (district)
Radio masts and towers in Germany